The black mastiff bat (Molossus rufus) is a bat species. It ranges from the northern region of South America (excluding Chile), most of Central America (excluding Belize) and parts of southern Mexico.

Taxonomy
The black mastiff bat was described as a new species in 1805 by French naturalist Étienne Geoffroy Saint-Hilaire. The holotype had been collected in Cayenne, French Guiana.

Description
Individuals weight .

Range and habitat
The black mastiff bat is a widespread species, occurring throughout much of Central and South America. Its range includes the following countries: Argentina, Belize, Bolivia, Brazil, Colombia, Costa Rica, Ecuador, El Salvador, French Guiana, Guatemala, Guyana, Honduras, Mexico, Nicaragua, Panama, Paraguay, Peru, Trinidad and Tobago, and Uruguay. Its habitat includes forests and shrublands, with human structures used as roosts.

Conservation
As of 2015, it is evaluated as a least-concern species by the IUCN. It meets the criteria for this classification because it has a wide geographic range; its population is presumably large; and it is unlikely to be experiencing rapid population decline. The species is known to be impacted by the polyctenid parasitic bug Hesperoctenes fumarius.

References

Molossus (bat)
Mammals of Mexico
Mammals of Peru
Mammals of Colombia
Mammals of Ecuador
Bats of Brazil
Mammals of Bolivia
Mammals of Paraguay
Mammals of Argentina
Mammals described in 1805
Bats of Central America
Bats of South America
Taxa named by Étienne Geoffroy Saint-Hilaire